Thibodeaux is a Cajun (French) surname. Notable people with the surname include:

Bannon Goforth Thibodeaux (1812–1866), member of the United States House of Representatives who represented Louisiana, 1845–1849
Henry S. Thibodaux (1769–1827), former governor of Louisiana
Kathy Thibodeaux (born 1956), American ballet dancer and co-founder of Ballet Magnificat!
Kayvon Thibodeaux (born 2000), American football player
Keith Thibodeaux (born 1950), actor and musician
Keith Thibodeaux (American football) (born 1974), American football player in the National Football League who played cornerback
Rufus Thibodeaux (1934–2005), American Cajun music fiddler
Seth Thibodeaux, American college baseball coach
Tony Thibodeaux (1938–2010), American Cajun music fiddler

Other uses 

 Boudreaux and Thibodeaux, traditional Cajun jokes

See also 
Thibodeau

French-language surnames